Bondar may refer to:

Bondar, Ukrainian surname
Bondar, Iran (disambiguation), places in Iran
Bondar (dance), Ukrainian folk dance
Gregório Bondar, entomologist
Carin Bondar, biologist